William Martin Williams (September 12, 1877 – March 30, 1932) was an American football coach. Williams was a graduate of Auburn University. He later attended Harvard University.

Williams died in Baltimore, Maryland in 1932.

Head coaching record

References

1877 births
1932 deaths
Clemson Tigers football coaches
Auburn University alumni
Harvard University alumni
People from West Point, Georgia